The term hunter-warrior may refer to:
Hunter-warrior (archaeology), a term for semi-aristocratic hunter-gatherers in archaeology
Hunter-warrior, a term for licensed bounty-hunters in the Battle Angel Alita manga series